Horn is a small town in the Waldviertel in Lower Austria, Austria and the capital of the district of the same name.

Population

Sport
2008 Austrian Cup winner SV Horn is the local football club.

References

External links 

Cities and towns in Horn District
Horn District